Bison latifrons, also known as the giant bison or long-horned bison, is an extinct species of bison that lived in North America during the Pleistocene epoch ranging from Alaska to Mexico. It was the largest and heaviest bovid ever to live in North America. It thrived in North America for about 200,000 years, but became extinct some 20,00030,000 years ago, at the beginning of the last glacial maximum.

Description
 
Because only skulls and horns of this species have been found well preserved, the size of B. latifrons is currently not clearly known. Based on leg bones, the mass of B. latifrons has been estimated to be 25-50 percent larger than that of modern B. bison, making it undoubtedly one of the largest ruminants ever.

The known dimensions of the species are on average larger than any extinct and extant bovids, including both the American bison and the European bison, making it the largest known bovid.

Evolution

B. latifrons is thought to have evolved in midcontinent North America from B. priscus, another prehistoric species of bison that migrated across the Bering Land Bridge between 240,000 and 220,000 years ago. B. latifrons was one of many species of North American megafauna that became extinct during the transition from the Pleistocene to the Holocene epoch (an event referred to as the Holocene extinction). It is thought to have disappeared some 21,00030,000 years ago, during the late Wisconsin glaciation. But unlike many other megafauna that died out and left no living descendants (at least in the Americas), B. latifrons evolved into the smaller Bison antiquus which made it better adapted to flourish on the open plains. B. antiquus in turn evolved into the yet smaller Bison bison — the modern American bison — some 10,000 years ago by hybridization with Bison occidentalis which was smaller but more numerous than Bison antiquus. Decreasing in size through hybridization caused bison to continue increasing in population in North America until the Europeans arrived.

Habitat and behavior
A herbivore, B. latifrons is believed to have lived in small family groups, grazing in the Great Plains and browsing in the woodlands of North America. Paleontologists believe it preferred the warmer climes of what is now the United States, and fossils of the species have been found as far south and west as modern-day San Diego, California. The large, thick horns of the males are believed to have been employed as a visual deterrent to large carnivorous megafauna such as the saber-toothed cat and giant short-faced bear, and also to establish dominance in battle with other males for the right to mate. In 2014, the National Institute of Anthropology and History found remains of B. latifrons in Chilpancingo, Guerrero, southern Mexico.

References

External links

At Paleocraft.com
Cast at Royal Saskatchewan Museum

Bison
Prehistoric bovids
Pleistocene even-toed ungulates
Pleistocene mammals of North America
Prehistoric mammals of North America
Fossil taxa described in 1825
Mammals described in 1825